Shuanggang is a town in Jinnan District in the southeastern suburbs of Tianjin, People's Republic of China. , it has 2 residential communities and 16 villages under its administration.

The Tianjin TEDA Company started operating its first waste-incineration power plant on 16 December 2004. , the power plant has treated 400,000 tons of waste, and delivered 108 million kWh to the electricity grid. It can produce up to 24MW of electricity and processes 1,200 tons of waste daily (which amounts to approximately a quarter of the waste produced by Tianjin). Xia Qi et al, however, identify the waste-incineration power plant as a failed public-private partnership due to the poor reliability of the government partner.

Shuanggang does not have much arable land because of problems with soil texture and soil salinity.

See also 
 List of township-level divisions of Tianjin

References 

Towns in Tianjin